Jane Frances Mainwaring (born 1970) is a British Anglican bishop, who has served as Bishop of Hertford, a suffragan bishop in the Diocese of St Albans, since February 2023. She had previously been Archdeacon of St Albans from March 2020 to 2023.

Early life and education
Mainwaring was born in 1970. She studied theology and religious studies at Leeds University, graduating with a Bachelor of Arts (BA) degree in 1992. She later studied at Trinity College, Carmarthen, graduating with a Master of Philosophy (MPhil) degree in 1997 and a Doctor of Philosophy (PhD) degree in 1999. Her doctoral thesis was titled "Quality and diversity in Anglican primary schools: a study of denominational inspection". From 1998 to 2000, she also trained for ordination on the East Anglian Ministerial Training Course.

Ordained ministry
She was ordained deacon in 2000 and priest in 2001. After a curacy in Sudbury, Suffolk she was the incumbent at Hitchin until her appointment as archdeacon.

In November 2022, it was announced that Mainwaring would be the next Bishop of Hertford, a suffragan bishop in the Diocese of St Albans. She was consecrated a bishop on 2 February 2023 (the Feast of Candlemas) by Justin Welby, Archbishop of Canterbury, at Canterbury Cathedral.

References

1970 births
Living people
21st-century English Anglican priests
21st-century Church of England bishops
Archdeacons of St Albans
Bishops of Hertford
Alumni of the University of Leeds
People associated with Trinity University College